Deiphobe mesomelas is an Asian species of praying mantis in the family Rivetinidae. There are no subspecies for this species listed in the Catalogue of Life.

References

Mantodea
Insects described in 1792